Shin Heung-do (born 24 May 1942) is a North Korean gymnast. He competed in eight events at the 1972 Summer Olympics.

References

1942 births
Living people
North Korean male artistic gymnasts
Olympic gymnasts of North Korea
Gymnasts at the 1972 Summer Olympics
Place of birth missing (living people)
20th-century North Korean people